John Thomas McCook (born June 20, 1944) is an American actor. He first gained prominence for his portrayal of the character Lance Prentiss on the television soap opera The Young and the Restless (from 1975 - 1980). Since March 1987, he has played the role of Eric Forrester on The Bold and the Beautiful, winning the Daytime Emmy Award for Outstanding Lead Actor in a Drama Series in 2022 after four nominations.

Career
McCook was discovered by Jack Warner while performing in a production of West Side Story. He signed to Universal Studios before spending two years in the US Army.

McCook portrayed the character of Lance Prentiss on The Young and the Restless from October 1975 to February 1980, leaving when the show moved to the hour format. Since March 1987, he has played the role of Eric Forrester on The Bold and the Beautiful. Currently, McCook and Katherine Kelly Lang (Brooke Logan) are the show's two longest-serving actors, and both debuted in the first episode.  McCook is only seven years older than Ronn Moss, who formerly played his son on the show.

He has performed in musical theatre, and has appeared as a guest on dozens of primetime series. B&B co-star Winsor Harmon once starred with McCook on an episode of Acapulco H.E.A.T. filmed in Mexico. Harmon told Soap Opera Digest about their guest stint on H.E.A.T.: "I hung out with John McCook the whole time and I kept watching all these people from other countries asking for his autograph. I'm thinking to myself, 'Who the hell is this guy?' So one night, we were drinking Coronas and I asked him why he had so many fans and he explained how B&B was so popular around the world. I had no idea. The more he talked about it, the more I was thinking, 'I want to be on that show.'... The first time I drove into the parking lot, there was John, just pointing at me and laughing. He asked what I was doing here and I told him that I was Thorne. That's when he told me that he was going to be playing my dad. That was just too wild."

In 2001, 2012, and 2018, McCook received a Daytime Emmy nomination in the Outstanding Lead Actor category for his portrayal of Eric Forrester. In 2022, McCook won the Daytime Emmy Award for Outstanding Lead Actor in a Drama Series for the same role.

Personal life
John McCook has been married since 1980 to former actress Laurette Spang, with whom he has three children, Jake Thomas (born 1981), Rebecca Jeanne (born 1983), and Molly (born July 30, 1990) who is also an actress.

He was married twice previously, including to dancer/actress Juliet Prowse (1972–1979), by whom he had one son, Seth, born in August 1972.

John McCook lives with his family in the Greater Los Angeles Area.

Awards and nominations

References

External links

1944 births
Living people
American male film actors
American male television actors
American male soap opera actors
Daytime Emmy Award winners
Daytime Emmy Award for Outstanding Lead Actor in a Drama Series winners
People from Ventura, California